Ashgate is a UK-based academic publishing company.

Ashgate may also refer to:

 Ashgate, Derbyshire, an area within the district of Chesterfield, Derbyshire county, UK